Bergon is a surname. Notable people with the surname include:

Frank Bergon (born 1943), American writer
Paul Bergon (1863–1912), French photographer, musician, and naturalist

See also
Bergön, Swedish island in the far north of the Bay of Bothnia
Berton